Nokia 106 is a feature phone. It has a has a 1.8-inch, 160x120 QQVGA screen and it supports EGSM900/1800. It has FM (headset required) and a speaking clock. It does not support any connectivity option like GPRS, EDGE, or Bluetooth.

References 

Nokia official website (active) https://www.nokia.com/phones/en_int/nokia-106
Nokia official website (deprecated) http://www.nokia.com/global/products/phone/106/

External links 

106
Mobile phones introduced in 2013
Mobile phones with user-replaceable battery